Ted Johansson (born June 29, 1992) is a Swedish professional ice hockey player. He played with Luleå HF in the Elitserien during the 2010–11 Elitserien season.

References

External links

1992 births
Living people
Luleå HF players
Swedish ice hockey right wingers